Poramet Arjvirai (born 20 July 1998), is a Thai professional footballer who plays as a forward for Thai League 1 club Muangthong United and the Thailand national team.

Club career
He plays for Muangthong United. in 2017 he is loan to Udon Thani and Bangkok he returned to Muangthong United in June 2018.

International career
In 2022, he was called up for the 2022 AFF Championship by Head Coach Alexandré Pölking.

International goals 
Scores and results list Thailand's goal tally first.

Honours

International
Thailand
 AFF Championship (1): 2022

References

External links
Poramet Arjvirai at soccerway.com

1998 births
Living people
Poramet Arjvirai
Poramet Arjvirai
Association football forwards
Poramet Arjvirai
Poramet Arjvirai
Poramet Arjvirai
Poramet Arjvirai
Poramet Arjvirai
Poramet Arjvirai